The Odd Fellows Hall is a building at 165–171 Grand Street between Centre and Baxter Streets, in the Little Italy and SoHo neighborhoods of Manhattan, New York City. It was built in 1847–1848 and designed by the firm of Trench & Snook in the Italianate style, one of the city's earliest structures in this style, which Joseph Trench had brought to New York with his design for 280 Broadway in 1845. His partner, John B. Snook, was responsible for many cast-iron buildings in SoHo. The mansard roof was an addition, designed by John Buckingham and built in 1881–1882. The Independent Order of Odd Fellows used the building until the 1880s, when they moved uptown with the city's population. The building was afterwards converted for commercial and industrial use.

The building was designated a New York City landmark in 1982, and was added to the National Register of Historic Places in 1983.

See also
 National Register of Historic Places listings in Manhattan below 14th Street
 List of New York City Designated Landmarks in Manhattan below 14th Street
 List of Odd Fellows Halls

References
Notes

External links
 

Queen Anne architecture in New York City
Italianate architecture in New York City
Buildings and structures completed in 1848
Clubhouses on the National Register of Historic Places in Manhattan
Odd Fellows buildings in New York (state)
1848 establishments in New York (state)
SoHo, Manhattan